Kenneth Bruffee (September 1, 1934–January 20, 2019) was an American writing center administrator and  professor emeritus in the department of English at Brooklyn College.

Background
Bruffee published the first peer tutoring handbook, A Short Course in Writing, in 1972. While a writing program administrator at Brooklyn College, Bruffee played a leading role in the development of writing center studies, and collaborated with both educators and administrators across several CUNY institutes to establish  peer tutoring as a standard academic support service within NYC public higher education. The rise of writing centers was necessitated by a growing population of students who were unprepared for college writing. In 1979, Bruffee and colleagues founded the Brooklyn College Institute for Training Peer Tutors, which trained peer tutors and encouraged the development of writing centers and writing labs.

In 2007, Bruffee gave the keynote address at the 25th National Conference on Peer Tutoring and Writing.  In 2008, the Writing Center Journal issued a special issue on Kenneth Bruffee and the Brooklyn Plan.

Bruffee graduated from Wesleyan University and earned a Ph.D. in English from Northwestern University. He has taught at the University of New Mexico, Northwestern University, the University of Virginia, Columbia University, Cooper Union, and the University of Pennsylvania."

Publications 
 Collaborative Learning: Higher Education, Interdependence and the Authority of Knowledge (Johns Hopkins University Press; 1993)
 A Short Course in Writing: Composition, Collaboration and Constructive Reading (Peason, Longman; 2006)
 Elegetic Romance: Cultural Change and the Loss of the Hero in Modern Fiction (Cornell University Press; 1983)

Notes

See also
 Writing Centers
 Peer tutors

Brooklyn College faculty
Wesleyan University alumni
2019 deaths
1934 births